The following were mayors of Hedon, Yorkshire, England:

1683-4: Hugh Bethell

References

English politicians
Hedon